Nezhdanova is a Russian feminine surname. It may refer to
Antonina Nezhdanova (1873–1950), Russian lyric soprano
4361 Nezhdanova, a minor planet named after her